Diego Alberto Colorado (born 31 August 1973 in Jardín, Antioquia) is a male long-distance runner from Colombia. He represented his country in the marathon at the 2001 World Championships in Athletics, taking 32nd place. He has won medals on the track over 10,000 metres, taking bronze at the 2005 South American Championships in Athletics and silver at the 2008 CAC Championships.

In October 2011, he won the silver medal in the men's marathon event at the 2011 Pan American Games in Guadalajara, Mexico, clocking a total time of 2:17:13, behind Brazil's Solonei Silva (2:16.37) and before the bronze winner, fellow Colombian Juan Carlos Cardona (2:18:20). He also won the bronze medal in the men's marathon event at the 2003 Pan American Games in Santo Domingo, Dominican Republic, clocking a total time of 2:21.48, behind Brazil's Vanderlei de Lima (2:19:08) and Canada's Bruce Deacon (2:20:35).

He was the first South American home at the 2011 Bogotá Half Marathon, taking fourth place behind East African opposition.

Personal bests
5000 m: 14:23.84 –  Santander de Quilichao, 17 November 2012
10,000 m: 29:10.75 –  Santiago, 13 March 2014
Half marathon: 1:03:09 –  Medellín, 4 Oct 1997
Marathon: 2:16:48 –  Nashville, Tennessee, 29 April 2000

Achievements

References

 Profile

External links

1973 births
Living people
Colombian male long-distance runners
Colombian male marathon runners
Athletes (track and field) at the 2003 Pan American Games
Athletes (track and field) at the 2007 Pan American Games
Athletes (track and field) at the 2011 Pan American Games
Pan American Games silver medalists for Colombia
Pan American Games bronze medalists for Colombia
Pan American Games medalists in athletics (track and field)
South American Games bronze medalists for Colombia
South American Games medalists in athletics
Competitors at the 2014 South American Games
Medalists at the 2003 Pan American Games
Medalists at the 2011 Pan American Games
Sportspeople from Antioquia Department
20th-century Colombian people
21st-century Colombian people